Michael L. McDonald (born 17 March 1975 in Saint Mary Parish, Jamaica) is a Jamaican runner who competed mainly in the 400 metres.

Career

He competed for Jamaica at the 1996 Summer Olympics held in Atlanta, United States where he won the bronze medal in the men's 4 × 400 metres relay with his teammates Roxbert Martin, Greg Haughton and Davian Clarke.

A brother of Beverly McDonald, he won a gold medal at the 1998 Commonwealth Games in the 4 × 400 metres relay event and broke the Commonwealth Games record.

Notes

Both at the 1997 World Championships in Athletics held in Athens, Greece, and at the 1999 World Championships in Athletics held in Sevilla, Spain, the Jamaica 4 × 400 team won originally the bronze medal, but the USA 4 × 400 team, which originally finished first in 4 × 400 m relay, was disqualified in 2008 due to Antonio Pettigrew confession of using human growth hormone and EPO between 1997 and 2003.  Therefore, the silver medal was later awarded to the team from Jamaica.

International competitions 

1Did not finish in the semifinals

External links

Picture of Michael McDonald

References

 

1975 births
Living people
People from Saint Mary Parish, Jamaica
Jamaican male sprinters
Olympic bronze medalists for Jamaica
Athletes (track and field) at the 1995 Pan American Games
Athletes (track and field) at the 1996 Summer Olympics
Athletes (track and field) at the 1998 Commonwealth Games
Athletes (track and field) at the 1999 Pan American Games
Athletes (track and field) at the 2000 Summer Olympics
Olympic athletes of Jamaica
Commonwealth Games gold medallists for Jamaica
Commonwealth Games medallists in athletics
World Athletics Championships medalists
Medalists at the 2000 Summer Olympics
Medalists at the 1996 Summer Olympics
Pan American Games gold medalists for Jamaica
Pan American Games silver medalists for Jamaica
Olympic silver medalists for Jamaica
Olympic silver medalists in athletics (track and field)
Olympic bronze medalists in athletics (track and field)
Pan American Games medalists in athletics (track and field)
Goodwill Games medalists in athletics
Central American and Caribbean Games silver medalists for Jamaica
Competitors at the 2002 Central American and Caribbean Games
World Athletics Indoor Championships winners
World Athletics Indoor Championships medalists
Central American and Caribbean Games medalists in athletics
Competitors at the 1998 Goodwill Games
Competitors at the 2001 Goodwill Games
Medalists at the 1995 Pan American Games
Medalists at the 1999 Pan American Games
Goodwill Games gold medalists in athletics
Medallists at the 1998 Commonwealth Games